Wellsford is an unincorporated community in Kiowa County, Kansas, United States.

History
Wellsford had a post office from the 1880s until 1955.

Previously, Wellsford was an incorporated city, but it disincorporated in 1975. Wellsford was incorporated in the 1910s and recorded a population of 140 in 1920. The population steadily declined thereafter, and in the last census taken while Wellsford was incorporated, in 1970, the town's population was only 9.  

Wellsford was the most recent Kansas town to be disincorporated until Treece was in 2012.

Today, the townsite contains a church and a historic one-room jailhouse from the late 1800s.

Geography
Wellsford is located at  (37.6166851, -99.0287147).

References

Further reading

External links

 Kiowa County maps: Current, Historic, KDOT

Unincorporated communities in Kansas
Unincorporated communities in Kiowa County, Kansas